Kristina Háfoss (born Danielsen; 26 June 1975) is a Faroese economist, lawyer, politician (Tjóðveldi) and former national swimmer for the Faroe Islands. She was Minister of Finance of the Faroe Islands from 2015-2019. She was elected for the Løgting again in 2019, but took leave from 1 February 2021 when she started in her new job as the Secretary-General of the Nordic Council.

Background
She lived in Copenhagen the first four years of her life, because her parents lived there while her father was studying there and her mother was working there, both parents being Faroese. After that she grew up in the Faroe Islands, mostly in Argir, which today has grown together with Tórshavn. She is the daughter of John P. Danielsen from Klaksvík and Anna Helena Danielsen (born Zachariasen) from Tórshavn. Her grandfather on her mother's side was Louis Zachariasen from Kirkja on the small island Fugloy. He was a teacher but stopped teaching when he could not teach the children in the Faroese language. He was a politician for the Home Rule Party.

Háfoss was a competition swimmer when she was a child and teenager, she swam for the local club in Tórshavn, Havnar Svimjifelag and for the Faroe Islands. The swimming brought her together with another Faroese swimmer, Annika Olsen, who also became a politician later, they became friends at a young age and both were swimming for the Faroe Islands national team. After stopping her swimming career while attending high school in Hoydalar, she began playing volleyball on club level.

Háfoss has degrees as Candidate of Law (Cand.jur.) from 2002 and economics (Cand.polit.) from 2003, both degrees taken from the University of Copenhagen. Háfoss was employed by the Danish Ministry of Foreign Affairs 1998–1999, by the Ministry of Finance 1999–2000 and by the Prime Ministers Office in the Faroe Islands in the summer periods of 1999 and 2000. She was economical advisor under the work of Action Plan for the outlying islands of the Faroes (in Faroese called Útoyggjar, the small islands which have very small populations and are not connected to the main area of the Faroes) 2000–2001, she worked as an economist in the Landsbanki Føroya 2004–2005 and Project Manager and investment advisor in Føroya Banki in 2006. From 2007 until 2011 she was the Head of Department at The Faroe Insurance Company.

Political career
Háfoss was deputy president of the  næstformand i the Voters Union (Valfelag) of Suðurstreymoyar Tjóðveldisfelag 2001–2002. She was elected to the Løgting from South Streymoy 2002–2004, she was member of Republic's  Tjóðveldisflokkurins working committee 2004–2005. In February 2008 she became Minister of Culture in the second cabinet of Jóannes Eidesgaard, but withdraw from the position due to personal reasons a half year later. On 29 October 2011 she was again elected to the Faroese parliament with 451 personal votes which was second most on the Tjóðveldi list, next after Høgni Hoydal.

Member of standing committees of the Løgting 
2002–2004 member of the Finance Committee
2011–2015 deputy chairperson of the Finance Committee
2019–2021 member of the Finance Committee

References

External links 
 

1975 births
Living people
Members of the Løgting
Republic (Faroe Islands) politicians
Ministers of Culture of the Faroe Islands
Faroese female swimmers
Women government ministers of the Faroe Islands
21st-century women politicians
Female finance ministers